Thomas Paul Richard Bloxham MBE (born 20 December 1963) is a British property developer, founder of award winning urban renewal property development company Urban Splash and the modern housebuilder House by Urban Splash - companies which have won 450 awards to date for architecture, design and business success.  

In 1999 Bloxham was appointed Member of the Order of the British Empire (MBE) in the 1999 Birthday Honours for Services to Architecture and Urban Regeneration.

Background
Bloxham was born in Hampshire and went to Tiffin School leaving in 1983 to go to Manchester to study Politics & Modern History at the Victoria University of Manchester. During his time at university he opened a music and poster shop in Afflecks Palace and sold fire extinguishers door-to-door; he tried to increase sales by demonstrating them by setting his briefcase on fire then extinguishing it.

Urban Splash
Bloxham began subletting portions of his unit at Afflecks Palace and this began his career in property. Bloxham co-founded Urban Splash with architect Jonathan Falkingham and initially converted redundant properties, mainly formerly industrial buildings, in north west England into city centre residential loft apartments.

Headquartered in Castlefield, Manchester, with regional bases in Liverpool, Leeds, Bristol, Sheffield, Cambridgeshire and Plymouth, the company has created more than 5,000 new homes and jobs and over two million sq ft of commercial space. The company has won over 450 awards for architecture and regeneration, including 46 RIBA awards.   

He is an Honorary Fellow of the Royal Institute of British Architects (RIBA) and in 1999, he was given an MBE.

In September 2012 the company reported pre-tax losses of £9.3 million and debts of £234.4 million for the previous year.

In the aftermath of the 2017 Grenfell Tower fire a number of Urban Splash developments were found to have been constructed using flammable cladding and to not comply with the required Building regulations in the United Kingdom.

Pro Bono Appointments
Bloxham was elected Chancellor of The University of Manchester in June 2008 to take office from 1 August 2008 for a period of seven years. Bloxham was installed as Chancellor at a ceremony at the University's Whitworth Hall on 3 December 2008. At the same ceremony Sir Bernard Lovell, Sir Tim Berners-Lee, Edward Gregson and Eddie Davies received honorary degrees.

He completed his term of office on 1 August 2015 and was succeeded by the poet and broadcaster Lemn Sissay.

Tom has also held other pro bono positions including a Trustee of the Big Issue North, a Founding Chair of the Ancoats Urban Village Trust, a Founding Chair Centre for Cities Think Tank (2007 – 2010)  and Chair Arts Council (NW) (1999 – 2008).

He was a Trustee of the Tate from 2009 to 2017, a Founding Trustee of the MUFC Foundation (2007 – present), a Founding Trustee of the Bloxham Charitable Trust (2001 – present) and Founding Trustee of the Urban Splash Charitable Trust (2008 – present).

Other Achievements
Bloxham was Founding Chair of the Manchester International Festival which was established in 2004. 

In 2019 he was named North West Insider Property Personality of the Year and was named in the 2016 City AM Entrepreneur list. He has won awards including The College of Estate Management Property Award (2008) and The Royal Society of Arts RSA Bicentenary Medal.  

Bloxham has received an Honorary Fellowship, Cumbria University, an Honorary Doctorate of Business, University of Plymouth, an Honorary Doctorate, University of Manchester, an Honorary Degree of Doctor of Design, University of West England, an Honorary Doctorate of Design, Oxford Brookes University, and an Honorary Fellowship, Liverpool John Moores University.

References

Living people
1963 births
Members of the Order of the British Empire
People educated at Tiffin School
People associated with the University of Manchester
British real estate businesspeople
Alumni of the Manchester Business School